The Icelandic Dream (Icelandic: Íslenski draumurinn) is a 2000 Icelandic film directed by Róbert Ingi Douglas. The movie depicts the story about an average Icelander and his dream to maintain wealth and fame.

Plot
Þórhallur Sverrisson stars as "Tóti", a 29-year-old grade school graduate who tries to earn his living by importing Bulgarian cigarettes to Iceland. His 18-year-old girlfriend "Dagmar", played by Hafdís Huld, is trying to put up with him and his hobbies and soccer, while in high school (Menntaskóli). His best friend "Valli", a house painter and a longtime friend of Tóti speaks his mind throughout the movie, such as his thoughts on women and his patriotic ideas on Iceland, he is played by Jón Gnarr.

Cast
Þórhallur Sverrisson
Jón Gnarr
Matt Keeslar
Hafdís Huld
Laufey Brá Jónsdottir
Þorsteinn Bachmann

Reception
The movie was filmed in Reykjavík, Iceland. It was one of the three biggest box office movies in Iceland in the year 2000. The dialogue of the film was improvised. Þórhallur Sverrisson and Jón Gnarr performance in the film set new standard in Icelandic film and television acting. The director, Róbert Ingi Douglas, created a movie that was considerably admired for its portrayal of joy, sadness and laughter in a film about the common Icelandic man and his life.

References

External links
 
 

Icelandic Dream
Icelandic Dream
Icelandic Dream
Icelandic Dream
Icelandic Dream
2000s Icelandic-language films
English-language Icelandic films
Thai-language films
Films scored by Jóhann Jóhannsson
Films directed by Róbert Ingi Douglas
2000 independent films
2000 comedy films
2000s English-language films
2000 multilingual films